Cancellaria indentata is a species of sea snail, a marine gastropod mollusk in the family Cancellariidae, the nutmeg snails.

Description

Distribution

References

 Jousseaume, F., 1887. Diagnoses de coquilles nouvelles de la famille des Cancellariidae. Le Naturaliste 9(14), sér. série 2

External links
 Sowerby, G. B., I. (1832). [Characters and descriptions of new species of Mollusca and Conchifera collected by Mr. Cuming]. Proceedings of the Committee of Science and Correspondence of the Zoological Society of London. 2 (1832): 50-61.
  Hemmen J. (2007) Recent Cancellariidae. Annotated and illustrated catalogue of Recent Cancellariidae. Privately published, Wiesbaden. 428 pp. [With amendments and corrections taken from Petit R.E. (2012) A critique of, and errata for, Recent Cancellariidae by Jens Hemmen, 2007. Conchologia Ingrata 9: 1-8
 Petit, R. E. (2009). George Brettingham Sowerby, I, II & III: their conchological publications and molluscan taxa. Zootaxa. 2189: 1–218

Cancellariidae
Gastropods described in 1832